734 Naval Air Squadron (734 NAS) was a Naval Air Squadron of the Royal Navy's Fleet Air Arm. It was active between 1944 and 1946, formed as a naval Engine Handling Unit. Initially operating out of RNAS Worthy Down, it subsequently relocated to RNAS Peplow, where it eventually disbanded.

History of 734 NAS

Engine Handling Unit (1944 - 1946) 

The Fleet Air Arm used modified, ex-Royal Air Force Mk VIIs, to train the aircrew, having previously evaluated the Whitley. The pre-war designed bombers were fitted out to become a flying 'class room', with instrumentation and fuel flow meters, to give student pilots an understanding of throttle and boost settings, to enable those aircrew, converting from biplanes, the correct way to handle the Rolls-Royce Merlin-powered Barracuda aircraft.

On the 21 August 1945, 734 NAS moved from RNAS Worthy Down to RNAS Hinstock (HMS Godwit), located in Hinstock, Shropshire, however, it operated out of Hinstock's satellite airfield, RNAS Peplow (HMS Godwit), also located in Shropshire, which was a former Royal Air Force bomber base, with long runways, that could easily accommodate the Whitley.

In November 1945 six Avro Lancaster aircraft were transferred from the Air Ministry to the Admiralty, intended to replace the Armstrong Whitley operated by 734 NAS. Additionaly, the squadron was to also have been the only Fleet Air Arm unit to receive Boeing B-17 Flying Fortress, however, none of this came to fruition with the squadron being disbanded on 21 February 1946 and the Lancasters were instead issued to 780 NAS Advanced Flying Training Squadron.

Aircraft flown
The squadron only flew one aircraft type:

 Armstrong Whitworth Whitley Mk VII (Feb 1944-Feb 1946)

Naval Air Stations  

734 Naval Air Squadron operated from a couple of naval air stations of the Royal Navy, in England:
Royal Naval Air Station  WORTHY DOWN (14 February 1944 - 21 August 1945)
Royal Naval Air Station HINSTOCK (21 August 1945 - 21 February 1946)

Commanding Officers 

List of commanding officers of 734 Naval Air Squadron with month and year of appointment and end:
 Lt-Cdr(A) R. C. Cockburn, DSO, RNVR (Feb 1944 – Dec 1945)
 Lt-Cdr(A) R. G. Parkes, RNVR (Dec 1945 – Feb 1946)

References

Citations

Bibliography

700 series Fleet Air Arm squadrons
Military units and formations established in 1941
Military units and formations of the Royal Navy in World War II